Tomasz Bogusław Kucharski (born 16 February 1974, in Gorzów Wielkopolski) is a Polish competition rower and Olympic champion. As of 2015, he serves in the Polish Sejm.

Together with Robert Sycz, Kucharski won two gold medals in lightweight double sculls, at the 2000 Summer Olympics and at the 2004 Summer Olympics.

For his sport achievements, he received the Order of Polonia Restituta:
  Knight's Cross (5th Class) in 2000
  Officer's Cross (4th Class) in 2004

References

External links
 

1974 births
Living people
Sportspeople from Gorzów Wielkopolski
Polish male rowers
Olympic rowers of Poland
Rowers at the 2000 Summer Olympics
Rowers at the 2004 Summer Olympics
Olympic gold medalists for Poland
Olympic medalists in rowing
Medalists at the 2004 Summer Olympics
Medalists at the 2000 Summer Olympics
World Rowing Championships medalists for Poland
Civic Platform politicians
Members of the Polish Sejm 2015–2019